Bolzano/Bozen railway station  is the main station of Bolzano/Bozen, capital of the autonomous province of Alto Adige/Südtirol, in northeastern Italy.

The station was opened in 1859 by the Austrian Empire's Südbahn. It is located on the trans-Alpine Brenner Railway and a terminus of a branch line to Merano/Meran (County of Tirol's former capital), which continues to become Vinschgau Railway Merano/Meran-Malles/Mals.

The station is currently managed by Rete Ferroviaria Italiana (RFI). The commercial area of the passenger building, however, is managed by Centostazioni. Train services to and from the station are operated by Trenitalia, ÖBB-DB, Südtirol Bahn and Russian Railways (RZD).

Location
Bolzano/Bozen railway station is situated at Piazza della Stazione / Bahnhofplatz, at the southeastern edge of the city centre and a short, 5-minute walk away.

History
The station was opened on 16 May 1859, upon the completion of the Trento-Bolzano/Bozen section of the Brenner Railway. It was known as Bozen-Gries Bahnhof. The passenger building was designed by the Bozner architect Sebastian Altmann.

County of Tyrol 

In 1864, construction began on the final section of the Brenner Railway between Bolzano/Bozen and Innsbruck. This section was completed on 24 August 1867.

In 1871, rail services in the area were enhanced by the inauguration of the Puster Valley Railway (Pustertalbahn), which connected Bolzano/Bozen directly to Maribor/Marburg in today's Slovenia through San Candido/Innichen and Lienz. Train services today require three changes at Bressanone/Brixen, Lienz and Graz and are separately operated by Trenitalia, Südtirol Bahn, ÖBB and Slovenian Railways (SZ).

In 1881, a third railway line, Vinschgau Railway, joined the Bolzano/Bozen station through Merano/Meran, County of Tyrol's capital city. In order to cater for frequent holiday makers, it was extended in 1906 from Merano to Malles/Mals.

From 1898 to 1974, Bolzano/Bozen was the terminus of the Überetsch Railway to Caldaro/Kaltern.

Transfer to Italy

After the First World War, the Treaty of Saint-Germain-en-Laye (1919) rewarded Italy with County of Tyrol's territory south of the Brenner Pass. As a result, Bozen-Gries station was transferred to the Italian railway network and came under the management of the Ferrovie dello Stato (FS).

From 1927 to 1929, the station building was replaced by one in the style of Italy's fascist regime. It was designed by the architect Angiolo Mazzoni. The facade on the access road to the station was reworked into two half-columns and flanked by two statues, which were crafted by the Austrian artist Franz Ehrenhöfer, to represent electricity and steam. Ehrenhöfer also created masks on the cornices for the station complex, a fountain of St. Christopher and an allegory of River Adige (River Etsch) above the entrance to the clock tower,

Features
The passenger building hosts the main ticket office, Deutsche Bahn ticket office and a waiting room. Other facilities include a cafe-bar and a newsagent store. There are six platforms for passenger service and additional tracks for freight traffic.

Train services

The station has 5.5 million passenger movements per year and is therefore the busiest within the region in terms of passenger numbers.

Between 2010 and 2022, the station has been a stop for the weekly EuroNight train of Russian Railways between Moscow and Nice.

Germany, Austria and South Tyrol

(D for Germany, A for Austria)

 Night Train (ÖBB Nightjet) Munich-Milan: Munich (D) - Rosenheim (D) - Salzburg (A) - Villach (A) - Padua - Vicenza - Verona - Peschiera del Garda - Brescia - Milan
 Night Train (ÖBB Nightjet) Munich-Rome: Munich (D) - Rosenheim (D) - Salzburg (A) - Villach (A) - Padua - Vicenza - Verona - Bologna -  Florence - Chianciano Terme - Rome
 Intercity Train (ÖBB Eurocity) Munich-Verona/Venice: Munich (D) - Rosenheim (D) - Kufstein (A) - Wörgl (A) - Jenbach (A) - Innsbruck (A) - Brennero/Brenner - Fortezza/Franzensfeste - Bressanone/Brixen - Bolzano/Bozen - Trento - Rovereto - Verona - (Padua) - (Venice)
 Intercity Train (ÖBB Eurocity) Munich-Verona/Bologna: Munich (D) - Rosenheim (D) - Kufstein (A) - Wörgl (A) - Jenbach (A) - Innsbruck (A) - Brennero/Brenner - Fortezza/Franzensfeste - Bressanone/Brixen - Bolzano/Bozen - Trento - (Rovereto) - Verona - (Bologna)
 Regional Train (Trenitalia Regional) Brennero/Brenner-Merano/Meran: Brennero/Brenner - Vipiteno/Sterzing - Campo di Trens/Freienfeld - Fortezza/Franzensfeste - Bressanone/Brixen - Chiusa/Klausen - Bolzano/Bozen - Terlano/Terlan - Merano/Meran
 Regional Train (Südtirol Bahn Regio-Express) Bozen-Innsbruck: Bolzano/Bozen - Bressanone/Brixen - Fortezza/Franzensfeste - Brennero/Brenner - Innsbruck
 Night Train Motorail (car carrier), summer only) Hamburg-Verona: Hamburg-Altona station (D) - Hannover - Göttingen - Fulda - Munich (D) - Kufstein (A) - Innsbruck (A) - Bolzano/Bozen - Verona Porta Nuova

Italy

 High-speed Train (Italo) Bolzano/Bozen-Rome: Bolzano/Bozen - Trento - Rovereto - Verona - Bologna - Florence - Rome
High-speed Train (Trenitalia Frecciargento) Bolzano/Bozen-Naples: Bolzano/Bozen - Trento - Rovereto - Verona - Bologna - Florence - Rome - (Naples)
 High-speed Train (Trenitalia Frecciargento) Bolzano/Bozen-Sibari: Bolzano/Bozen - Trento - Rovereto - Verona - Bologna - Florence - Rome Tiburtina - Rome Termini - Naples Afragola - Salerno - Scalea-Santa Domenica Talao - Paola - Torano-Lattarico - Sibari
 Regional Train (Trenitalia Regional) Brennero/Brenner-Bologna: Brennero/Brenner - Vipiteno/Sterzing - Campo di Trens/Freienfeld - Fortezza/Franzensfeste - Bressanone/Brixen - Chiusa/Klausen - Bolzano/Bozen - Ora/Auer - Mezzocorona - Trento - Rovereto - Ala - Verona - Isola della Scala - Nogara - Ostiglia - Mirandola - Bologna
 Regional Train (Trenitalia Regional) Bolzano/Bozen-Ala: Bolzano/Bozen - Laives/Leifers - Ora/Auer - Egna/Neumarkt - Salorno/Salurn - Mezzocorona - Trento - Rovereto - Mori - Ala
 Regional Train (Trenitalia Regional) Bolzano/Bozen-Bassano del Grappa: Bolzano/Bozen - Ora/Auer - Trento - San Cristoforo al Lago-Ischia - Bassano del Grappa - (Castelfranco Veneto) - (Venice)

Cross-border

(A for Austria, F for France, CZ for Czech Republic, I for Italy, PL for Poland, BR for Belarus, R for Russia, MN for Monaco)

 Intercity Train (RZD EuroNight) Moscow-Nice: Moscow (Belorusskaja) (R) - Wjasma (R) - Smolensk (R) - Orscha Central (BR) - Minsk (BR) - Brest Central (BR) - Terespol (PL) - Warsaw West (Wschodnia) (PL) - Warsaw Central (Centralna) (PL)- Katowice (PL) - Zebrzydowice (PL) - Bohumin (CZ) - Breclav (CZ) - Vienna/Wien (A) - Linz-Donau (A) - Innsbuck (A) - Bolzano/Bozen (I) - Verona (I) - Milan (Rogoredo) (I) - Genoa (Piazza Principe) (I) - San Remo (I) - Ventimiglia (I) - Menton (F) - Monaco Monte-Carlo (MN) - Nice (F)

See also

History of rail transport in Italy
List of railway stations in Trentino-Alto Adige/Südtirol
Rail transport in Italy
Railway stations in Italy

References

Notes

Further reading

External links

Centostazioni: Information about Bolzano/Bozen railway station 
Description and pictures of Bolzano/Bozen railway station 

This article is based upon a translation of the Italian language version, and incorporates information from the German language version, as at December 2010.

Railway Station
Railway stations in South Tyrol
Railway stations opened in 1859
1859 establishments in the Austrian Empire